Donald Brian (February 17, 1877 – December 22, 1948) was an actor, dancer and singer born in St. John's, Newfoundland (now Newfoundland and Labrador, Canada). In 1907, he starred in the hit operetta The Merry Widow.

Life and career
Brian, a tenor, was employed in a Boston machine shop and, at the age of 16, began performing with a vocal quartet. When he joined a theatrical troupe in New York City, he was soon in demand as a leading man. He had leading roles in more than 20 Broadway musicals. In 1915 Brian signed with film producer Jesse L. Lasky to do two films, The Voice in the Fog (1915) and The Smugglers (1916). After the latter he made no more film appearances until the sound era. His first sound film was an excerpt of his role in Peggy O'Hooligan (1925), made in the DeForest Phonofilm sound-on-film process.

Brian was president of the Catholic Actors Guild of America.

He was married twice—to Florence Meagher Gleason Pope in 1910, and second to stage actress Virginia O'Brien(1896-?) (not to be confused with the film actress born 1919). He and O'Brien had one daughter, Denise.

Brian died on December 22, 1948, in Great Neck, New York, aged 73.

Selected Broadway musicals and operettas

 1899 – On the Wabash
 1902 – Florodora
 1904 – Little Johnny Jones
 1906 – Forty-five Minutes from Broadway
 1907 – The Merry Widow
 1909 – The Dollar Princess
 1911 – The Siren
 1913 - The Marriage Market
 1914 – The Girl From Utah
 1916 – Sybil
 1918 – The Girl Behind the Gun
 1919 – Buddies
 1921 – The Chocolate Soldier
 1922 – Up She Goes
 1925 – Peggy O'Hooligan
 1926 – No, No, Nanette
 1939 – Very Warm for May

See also
 List of people of Newfoundland and Labrador

References

External links

Who's Who in Musicals
Donald Brian University of Washington, Sayre collection
Donald Brian NY Public Library, Billy Rose collection
Mrs. Donald Brian (Florence Gleason Brian) with Eugene Walter and Charlotte Walker

Further reading
 Donald Brian: the king of Broadway by Charles Foster (2005) 

1877 births
1948 deaths
People from St. John's, Newfoundland and Labrador
Pre-Confederation Newfoundland and Labrador people
20th-century Canadian male actors
Canadian tenors
Canadian male stage actors
Emigrants from Newfoundland Colony to the United States